Michael Rodrigues may refer to:

 Michael Rodrigues (politician) (born 1959), Democratic member of the Massachusetts Senate
 Michael Rodrigues (table tennis), Pakistani table tennis player
 Michael Rodrigues (acrobatic gymnast) (born 1982), American acrobatic gymnast

See also
 Michael Rodríguez (disambiguation)